Jason Brian Odom (born March 31, 1974) is an American former college and professional football player who was an offensive tackle in the National Football League (NFL) for four seasons during the 1990s.  Odom played college football for the University of Florida and received unanimous All-American honors. He played professionally for the NFL's Tampa Bay Buccaneers.

Early years 

Odom was born in Winter Haven, Florida in 1974.  He attended Bartow High School in Bartow, Florida,

College career 

Odom accepted an athletic scholarship to attend the University of Florida in Gainesville, Florida, where he was an offensive lineman for coach Steve Spurrier's Florida Gators football team from 1992 to 1995.  Odom was a four-year starter, a senior team captain in 1995, a first-team All-Southeastern Conference (SEC) selection in 1994 and 1995, and a unanimous first-team All-American in 1995.  In his four years as a Gator, the team won three consecutive SEC championships (1993, 1994, 1995), and played for a Bowl Alliance national championship in the 1996 Fiesta Bowl.  He was also the recipient of the SEC's Jacobs Blocking Trophy, recognizing the best blocker in the SEC, in 1994 and 1995.

Odom graduated from Florida with a bachelor's degree in exercise and sports science in 1996.  In one of a series of articles written for The Gainesville Sun in 2006, the newspaper's sports editors selected him as No. 28 of the top 100 Gators from the first 100 years of Florida football.  He was inducted into the University of Florida Athletic Hall of Fame as a "Gator Great" in 2010.

Professional career 

He started forty-one of the forty-six Buccaneers games in which he played. He was placed on injured reserve on August 27, 2000, ending his career.

Life after football 

Odom has served as a Hillsborough County Sheriff's Deputy in Tampa, Florida since 2008.

See also 

 1995 College Football All-America Team
 Florida Gators football
 History of the Tampa Bay Buccaneers
 List of Florida Gators football All-Americans
 List of Florida Gators in the NFL Draft
 List of SEC Jacobs Blocking Trophy winners
 List of University of Florida alumni
 University of Florida Athletic Hall of Fame

References

Bibliography 

 Carlson, Norm, University of Florida Football Vault: The History of the Florida Gators, Whitman Publishing, LLC, Atlanta, Georgia (2007).  .
 Golenbock, Peter, Go Gators!  An Oral History of Florida's Pursuit of Gridiron Glory, Legends Publishing, LLC, St. Petersburg, Florida (2002).  .
 Hairston, Jack, Tales from the Gator Swamp: A Collection of the Greatest Gator Stories Ever Told, Sports Publishing, LLC, Champaign, Illinois (2002).  .
 McCarthy, Kevin M.,  Fightin' Gators: A History of University of Florida Football, Arcadia Publishing, Mount Pleasant, South Carolina (2000).  .
 Nash, Noel, ed., The Gainesville Sun Presents The Greatest Moments in Florida Gators Football, Sports Publishing, Inc., Champaign, Illinois (1998).  .

1974 births
Living people
Sportspeople from Winter Haven, Florida
Players of American football from Florida
American football offensive tackles
Bartow High School alumni
Florida Gators football players
All-American college football players
Tampa Bay Buccaneers players